The Popular Autonomists (AP) are regionalist, autonomist and Christian-democratic political party in Trentino, Italy.

The party was formed in 2017 by Walter Kaswalder, after his ejection from the Trentino Tyrolean Autonomist Party.

In the 2018 provincial election the AP were part of the autonomist centre-right coalition, led by Maurizio Fugatti of Lega Nord Trentino, who was elected President of Trentino. For its part, the AP won 3.0% of the vote and Kaswalder was re-elected to the Provincial Council, of which he was elected president.

Leadership
President: Walter Kaswalder (2017–present)
Spokesperson: Michele Condini (2018–present)

References

External links
Official website

Political parties in Trentino
Political parties established in 2017
Christian democratic parties in Italy
Catholic political parties
2017 establishments in Italy